Lakeville is an unincorporated community in northeastern Washington Township, Holmes County, Ohio, United States.  It has a post office with the ZIP code 44638.  It lies along State Route 226 west of Odell Lake and south of Bonnett and Round Lakes.

References

Unincorporated communities in Holmes County, Ohio
Unincorporated communities in Ohio